Reinhold Soyka (born 22 March 1952) is a retired West German middle distance runner, who specialized in the 800 metres.

Competition Results
At the 1973 European Indoor Championships he won a silver medal in the 4 x 720 metres relay, together with Josef Schmid, Thomas Wessinghage and Paul-Heinz Wellmann. 

He finished sixth in the individual distance at the 1975 European Indoor Championships.

He became West German indoor champion in 1975.

Club Team
In domestic competitions, he represented the sports club LC Bonn.

References

1952 births
Living people
West German male middle-distance runners